The Malmaison Hotel Reading (formerly the Great Western Hotel) is a grade II listed hotel in the town of Reading in the English county of Berkshire. It is situated at the junction of Blagrave Street and Station Road, directly opposite the main entrance to Reading railway station. It was opened in 1844, shortly after the Great Western Railway opened its line from London, and is thought to be the oldest surviving purpose-built railway hotel in the world.

History 
When the Great Western Main Line from London to Bristol was completed in 1841 a hotel was needed for people visiting the town. According to English Heritage, the building is likely to have been designed by Isambard Kingdom Brunel, who was GWR's Chief Engineer at the time of its construction and who incorporated similar features in the Royal Station Hotel at Slough (which was demolished in 1938).

The building was completed in 1844 and was used as a hotel until a fire in the 1960s. Subsequently, the building was used as offices until it was renovated by the Malmaison hotel chain and reopened, in 2007, as the Malmaison Hotel.

References

External links 
 The Malmaison Hotel, Reading on the Maimaison website

Hotel buildings completed in 1844
Hotels in Reading, Berkshire
Railway hotels in England
Tourist attractions in Reading, Berkshire
Grade II listed buildings in Reading
Grade II listed hotels
Great Western Railway
Isambard Kingdom Brunel buildings and structures
Hotels established in 1844